Without a Sound is the sixth studio album by alternative rock band Dinosaur Jr., released on August 23, 1994. It is the first Dinosaur Jr. album not to feature Murph on drums, who is replaced by vocalist and guitarist J Mascis. It is also their most commercially successful album, peaking at number 44 on the Billboard Top 200. "Feel the Pain" and "I Don't Think So" were released as singles, with "Feel the Pain" reaching number 4 on the Billboard Modern Rock Tracks chart, becoming one of their biggest hits. Mascis later admitted that his father's death affected his writing and performance on this album, and he took three years to deliver the next Dinosaur Jr. LP, 1997's Hand It Over.

"Feel the Pain" is a playable track in the video games Guitar Hero World Tour and Rock Band 2.

Production and background
J Mascis said he had a hard time writing the album because his father had died around the time they were making the album. The cover artwork is a painting by former professional skateboarder Neil Blender, an early fan and friend of the band. The album title comes from a lyric in the song "Even You".

Reception

In July 2014, Guitar World put Without a Sound in their "Superunknown: 50 Iconic Albums That Defined 1994" list.

The closing song "Over Your Shoulder" was frequently used on the Japanese boxing reality show Gachinko Fight Club. In February 2019, 25 years after the album's release, "Over Your Shoulder" unexpectedly charted at #18 on the Billboard Japan Hot 100 based on digital streaming. The phenomenon was credited to YouTube postings of clips from Gachinko Fight Club registered as containing the song. For a period, clips from the series — which was a segment of a Japanese variety show — had frequently been favored by YouTube's algorithmic suggestions in Japan for unknown reasons.

Track listing
All songs by J Mascis.

2019 remaster bonus tracks
In 2019, the album was reissued as an expanded 2-CD deluxe edition that contained bonus tracks, including a recording of a full live performance at Brixton Academy on October 8, 1994. A double vinyl version was also released, albeit with a smaller selection of bonus tracks.

Personnel
Dinosaur Jr.
J Mascis - drums, guitar, keyboards, vocals
Mike Johnson - bass, vocals
Technical
John Agnello - Engineer, Mixing
Danny Kadar - Assistant Engineer
Mark Miller - Assistant Engineer
Brian Sperber - Assistant Engineer
John McLaughlin - Assistant Engineer
Bryce Goggin - Assistant Engineer
Bill Emmons - Assistant Engineer
Joe Pirrera - Assistant Engineer
Bob Ludwig - Mastering
Woody Jackson - Paintings
Roger Mayer - Sound Effects

Charts
Album - Billboard (United States)

Singles - Billboard (United States)

References

1994 albums
Dinosaur Jr. albums
Blanco y Negro Records albums
Sire Records albums